Aviandina was a small airline from Peru, which was operational between 1999 and 2003.

Destinations

Arequipa (Rodríguez Ballón International Airport)
Chiclayo (FAP Captain José Abelardo Quiñones González International Airport)
Cusco (Alejandro Velasco Astete International Airport)
Iquitos (Coronel FAP Francisco Secada Vignetta International Airport)
Juliaca (Inca Manco Cápac International Airport)
Lima (Jorge Chávez International Airport) Hub
Piura (PAF Captain Guillermo Concha Iberico International Airport)
Pucallpa (FAP Captain David Abensur Rengifo International Airport)
Tacna (Coronel FAP Carlos Ciriani Santa Rosa International Airport)
Tarapoto (Cadete FAP Guillermo del Castillo Paredes Airport)
Trujillo (Capitán FAP Carlos Martínez de Pinillos International Airport)

Fleet
Aviandina operated the following aircraft:

See also
List of defunct airlines of Peru

References

External links

Data
Logo
Flight review
Historical website

Defunct airlines of Peru
Airlines established in 1999
Airlines disestablished in 2003
1999 establishments in Peru